Thomson Glacier is a glacier about 8 nautical miles (15 km) long on Bryan Coast flowing between Rydberg and Wirth Peninsulas into Fladerer Bay. Named by Advisory Committee on Antarctic Names (US-ACAN) after Janet W. Thomson, British Antarctic Survey, head of the mapping operations from the 1980s to 2002, and member of the USA-UK cooperative project to compile Glaciological and Coastal-Change Maps of the Antarctic Peninsula.

See also
 List of glaciers in the Antarctic
 Glaciology

References
 

Glaciers of Ellsworth Land